Four is an album by jazz saxophonist Joe Henderson, recorded on April 21, 1968, but only released in 1994 by the Verve label. It features a live performance by Henderson with pianist Wynton Kelly, bassist Paul Chambers and drummer Jimmy Cobb.  The Allmusic review by Scott Yanow states: "Henderson really pushes the rhythm section (which, although they had not played with the tenor previously, had been together for a decade) and he is certainly inspired by their presence. This is a frequently exciting performance by some of the modern bop greats of the era". Further selections from this concert were released as Straight, No Chaser.

Track listing 
 "Autumn Leaves" (Kosma, Prévert, Mercer) – 13:37  
 "Four" (Davis) – 12:16  
 "On the Trail" (Grofe) – 14:55  
 "Stardust/Old Folks" (Carmichael, Parish/Robison, Hill) – 11:47  
 "On Green Dolphin Street" (Washington, Kaper) – 16:05  
 "The Theme" (Davis) – 2:57  
Recorded at Left Bank Jazz Society, Baltimore, MD on April 21, 1968

Personnel
Joe Henderson –  tenor saxophone
Wynton Kelly –  piano
Paul Chambers –  bass
Jimmy Cobb –  drums

References

Joe Henderson live albums
1968 live albums
Verve Records live albums